Marco Antônio de Almeida Ferreira, sometimes known as Marcão (born December 20, 1965), is a Brazilian former football player.

Club statistics

References

External links

odn.ne.jp

1965 births
Living people
Brazilian footballers
Brazilian expatriate footballers
J1 League players
Kashiwa Reysol players
Expatriate footballers in Japan
Association football defenders